RANS Family is a comedy program that aired in NET. Airing of the date . Played by Raffi Ahmad, Denny Wahyudi, Opie Kumis, Dede Sunandar, and part of Raffi's family and Nagita's family who had a role in this sitcom.

External links 
 Twitter RANS Family
 Official Twitter NET.

Indonesian television shows